The Fifth Division  of the Army of the Republic of Vietnam (ARVN)—the army of the nation state of South Vietnam that existed from 1955 to 1975—was part of the III Corps that oversaw the region of the country surrounding the capital, Saigon.

The Fifth Division was based in Biên Hòa, a town on the northern outskirts of Saigon, and due to the Division's close proximity to the capital Saigon was a key factor in the success or failure of the various coup attempts in the nation's history. As a result, the loyalty of the commanding officer of the Division was crucial in maintaining power.

History
The Division was originally established as the 3rd Field Division and redesignated as the 5th Infantry Division in 1960.

In the 1960 South Vietnamese coup attempt, the loyalist Colonel Nguyễn Văn Thiệu used the Division to storm into Saigon to save President Ngô Đình Diệm.

However, in  the successful coup attempt of 1963, Thiệu rebelled and the Division along with the rest of the III Corps of Tôn Thất Đính, attacked Saigon. Thiệu himself led the successful siege on Gia Long Palace. As a result, the leading generals made Thiệu a general.

The Division was largely composed of Nùng people until about 1965 when its composition was increasingly ethnic Vietnamese and the Nùngs moved into MIKE Force units. 

The principal sub-units of the division were the 7th, 8th and 9th Infantry Regiments and the 1st Armored Cavalry Regiment. The 9th Infantry Regiment (Divine Elephant) was based at Quan Loi near An Lộc. The 1st ACR was based at the division's forward base camp at Lai Khe.

On the morning of 10 June 1965 during the Battle of Đồng Xoài, the 1st Battalion, 7th Infantry Regiment was landed by helicopter near the Thuận Lợi rubber plantation, about 4 kilometres north of Đồng Xoài where they were ambushed by Viet Cong forces suffering heavy losses. The Division's US adviser reported that the commander, General Phạm Quốc Thuần, had  "gone to pieces" over the mauling his 7th Regiment had received and the unit was notorious for its high desertion rate.

In 1966 US advisers regarded the Division and the 25th Division as the two worst units in the ARVN. Both divisions guarded the approaches to Saigon, but the brunt of the fighting had been assumed by US combat units, the 1st and 25th Infantry Divisions and three separate brigades. Under their protection, the two divisions performed static security missions, but rather than using this respite to regroup and retrain their forces, or to hunt down the local VC, the Vietnamese commanders had let their units degenerate through inactivity, and US advisers now rated them lower than even the neighboring RF/PF. In early May General Westmoreland ordered the US 1st and 25th Divisions to "start working more closely with elements of these two [South Vietnamese] divisions on operations in order to improve their morale, efficiency and effectiveness." He suggested a "buddy" effort, matching the US 1st and the Division and the US 25th and the ARVN 25th Divisions. In mid-May the new US 1st Division commander, General William E. DePuy had one of his three brigades supporting the Division. Initially each unit contributed one infantry battalion to the project. Combined activities consisted of small unit patrolling, village seals and searches, propaganda campaigns, intelligence collection efforts, and various civic improvement projects. In July, however, with the bulk of his units engaged in heavy fighting north of Saigon, DePuy had to abandon the combined operations task force concept. Thereafter, DePuy monitored and supported the Division's activities in Bình Dương Province through his 2nd Brigade headquarters, only occasionally assigning ground units to the effort.

From 24 April to 17 May 1966 the Division participated in Operation Birmingham with the US 1st Infantry Division against the VC 9th Division in Tây Ninh Province.

From 19 May to 13 July 1966 the Division participated in Operation El Paso with the US 3rd Brigade, 1st Infantry Division in Bình Long Province against the VC 9th Division.

From 8–26 January 1967 4 battalions of the Division participated in Operation Cedar Falls a large US search and destroy mission against the Iron Triangle, Bình Dương Province. The ARVN role was primarily as a blocking force and population screening and evacuation while the US forces undertook offensive operations, nevertheless the Division lost 11 killed while total VC losses were 720 killed and 218 captured.

On 11 July 1967, a month following the beginnings of CORDS pacification project near Tan Hung, Bình Long Province, the first major program of civilian pacification and effective counterinsurgency, the HQ and HQ Company and two other companies would earn a Presidential Unit Citation from Lyndon Johnson. As CORDS would in-effect undermine the continual insurgency war, the PAVN 141st Regiment had launched a full-scale attack against the division HQ in hopes of quashing the experiment. The successful defence of the HQ and base had not only secured the continual pacification of the hamlet, but would demonstrate the effectiveness of the CORDS project which would by 1970 secure 93% of all villages and effectively end the VC insurgency.

In 1967 MACV assessed that the three ARVN divisions surrounding Saigon, the Division, 18th and the 25th Division had shown no improvement, and US advisers considered their commanders, Generals Pham Quoc Thuan, Do Ke Giai (18th Division) and Phan Trong Chinh (25th Division), flatly incompetent. The senior Junta generals had repeatedly agreed on the need to replace them, but, for political reasons, had taken no action. Although continually judged by American leaders as corrupt and incapable, General Thuan had strong political ties with the Junta generals, in this case, Thiệu. John Paul Vann noted the "widespread public belief that Thuan not only controlled most of the local bars and prostitution houses but also extorted protection fees for convoys moving through his Division tactical area. General DePuy, commanding the
nearby US 1st Infantry Division, agreed. He made the convoy protection charge public, as did a local Vietnamese province chief, perhaps with Vann's encouragement. Westmoreland could do little. He already had taken up the matter previously with Vien, but to no avail. Thuan had been Thieu's chief of staff when the latter had commanded the 5th Division back in 1962, and the division, together with General Dong's airborne units, remained Thiệu's major basis of power. In the interests of political stability, nothing could be done.

During the Tet Offensive attacks on Bien Hoa and Long Binh from 31 January to 2 February 1968 the Division and the 3rd Ranger Task Force, consisting of the 35th and 36th Ranger Battalions, successfully defended its headquarters and other key facilities in the Bien Hoa-Long Binh complex.

From 11 March to 7 April 1968 the Division's 7th and 8th Regiments participated in Operation Quyet Thang in Bình Dương Province with the US 2nd and 3rd Brigades, 1st Infantry Division to reestablish South Vietnamese control over the areas immediately around Saigon in the aftermath of the Tet Offensive.

From 8 April to 31 May 1968 the Division participated in Operation Toan Thang I to continue pressure on PAVN/VC forces in III Corps after the successful Operation Quyet Thang. The operation involved nearly every combat unit in III Corps. The operation was a success with allied forces claiming 7645 VC/PAVN killed, however the operation did not prevent the PAVN/VC from launching their May Offensive attacks against Saigon.

In September 1968 MACV rated General Thuần as inept and Division advisers noted that the Division had "withdrawn into a shell" and was doing nothing constructive." Minor incidents, like Thuần's daily pot shots at birds from the second story balcony of his home and the subsequent accidental wounding of his intelligence adviser, were not uncommon and at times trivialized and mocked the entire war effort. II Field Force, Vietnam commander Lt. Gen. Walter T. Kerwin, Jr. appealed to COMUSMACV General Creighton Abrams for help, and the MACV commander reportedly "raised hell" with President Thiệu over the matter, but Thiệu did nothing.

In June 1969 the new II Field Force, Vietnam commander Lt. Gen. Julian Ewell initiated the Dong Tien (or "Progress Together") Program with III Corps commander, General Đỗ Cao Trí, to "buddy up US and ARVN units to conduct combined operations [that would]... maximize the effectiveness of both forces [and] achieve in 2, 3, or 4 months a quantum jump in ARVN and RF/PF performance." The most important Dong Tien operation was between the Division and the US 1st Infantry Division. Both units stood astride Route 13, the major artery connecting the capital region with the Cambodian border and, conversely, a primary avenue to Saigon for PAVN/VC units infiltrating south. Since 1965 the American division had worked the area, driving the regular enemy units across the Cambodian border and slowly rooting out his larger local forces. During the same period the Division, under General Thuần, had generally performed what at best could be described as securing missions in central and southern Bình Dương Province. In 1968 South Vietnamese intelligence estimated that 17,000 PAVN/VC troops were active in the Division's theoretical area of responsibility, but out of almost 2000 combat operations supposedly conducted by one of the Division's regiments that year, only 36 had led to engagements with enemy forces, and these resulted in only 17 PAVN/VC reportedly killed and 5 captured, at a cost of 14 soldiers killed and 3 weapons lost. Such poor track records reflected what Americans derisively called Saigon's "search and avoid" tactics, and were patently unacceptable to Ewell and Trí. Up to 1969, overriding political concerns had forced MACV to live with the marginal performance of the Division. The close friendship between President Thiệu and General Thuần was well known, as was the political role of the Division in stabilizing the old military regime. However, by mid-1969 the political as well as the military situation around the capital had changed, and the threat of a military coup was remote. At the same time, the projected redeployment of US
forces from South Vietnam made it all the more necessary that Saigon bring units like the Division back into the mainstream of the war effort as soon as possible. In August 1969 Thuần was finally replaced as Division commander by General Nguyễn Văn Hiếu, however US officials had major reservations about this replacement, not regarding Hiếu as a dynamic leader. The Dong Tien operation between the two units lasted from July 1969 until the departure of the 1st Infantry Division from South Vietnam in March 1970. During this period infantry battalions of the Division's 7th Regiment worked extensively with those of the 1st Division's 2nd Brigade in central Bình Dương Province, while similar units of the Division's 8th Regiment operated with battalions of the 1st Division's 1st and 3rd Brigades in the northern Bình Dương jungles. In each case, US and ARVN infantry battalions shared common fire support bases and patrolled a common operational area in the dense forests surrounding these strongpoints. The two battalion commanders planned and commanded the operations jointly, with the Americans providing the helicopter support for troop movements and resupply. With the extra push of working with American commanders, staffs, and troops, the lethargic Vietnamese battalions began to wake up. As in the earlier pair-off program, decentralized operations meant that small-unit leaders learned to make decisions on their own, while battalion commanders and staffs learned to control airmobile operations and troop actions over a wider area. Marginal officers were identified and often replaced, and, perhaps most important, ARVN morale began to climb. Drawbacks to the 1st Division's Dong Tien operation were primarily in the areas of scope and duration. Periodically the ARVN regimental commanders
rotated participating infantry battalions, but only two were active in the program at anyone time, and neither the regimental nor the Division headquarters became closely involved in the effort. Later, as the program progressed, Hiếu brought a few of his artillery batteries into the endeavor, and approved liaison and training between various 1st and 5th Division support units. But only two Vietnamese artillery batteries ever participated, the involvement of other Division elements remained minimal, and the 9th Regiment took no part in the effort. Almost all helicopter and most artillery support were American. Another
significant factor, one that was both helpful and seductive, was the inactivity of PAVN/VC military forces, and thus, as in the other Dong Tien operations, there was no real test of South Vietnamese effectiveness in heavy fighting. However, when the program terminated in March 1970, it had pried the 5th Division out of its safe havens in southern Bình Dương and oriented its soldiers away from the political and economic concerns of the Saigon metropolitan area. As the 1st Infantry Division began its redeployment in early 1970, Hiếu moved his Division headquarters north and, with the help of adjacent American units, gradually took over responsibility for the 1st Division's former operational area without incident.

On 30 April 1970 as part of Operation Toan Thang 42 (Total Victory), an early phase of the Cambodian Campaign, a Division infantry regiment and the 1st Armored Cavalry Squadron together with other ARVN forces crossed into the Parrot's Beak region of Svay Rieng Province.

In mid-1970 MACV rated General Hiếu as "unsatisfactory" and recommended his relief. Regarded by US advisers as the worst ARVN Division commander, General Hieu's forces had been badly handled during the Battle of Snuol, and his troops, according to II Field Force commander Michael S. Davison, were close to mutiny. Pushed by both Abrams and Minh to relieve him, Thiệu finally acceded and in April 1971 brought Col. Lê Văn Hưng up from Phong Dinh Province to take over the battered Division. Unfortunately, Hưng was the one ARVN officer whose candidacy American advisers had specifically recommended against.

Easter Offensive

The attacks on Lac Long and other outposts in Tây Ninh were a diversion designed to cover the main thrust into Bình Long Province. To initiate the campaign in Bình Long, the VC 5th Division (numbering about 9,230 soldiers) was ordered to take Lộc Ninh, Bình Long's northernmost town. The VC were supported by the PAVN 69th Artillery Command (3,830 soldiers) and the 203rd Armored Regiment (800 soldiers). Defending Lộc Ninh was the 9th Infantry Regiment commanded by Colonel Nguyễn Công Vinh, supported by the 1st Cavalry Squadron, 1st Regional Force Battalion and elements of the 74th Ranger Battalion. The attack began around 06:50 on 5 April with a heavy barrage of artillery, rocket and mortar fire targeting the headquarters of the 9th Regiment and the Lộc Ninh district compound. The VC simultaneously mounted other attacks throughout the Division's areas of operations in Lai Khê and Quần Lợi. The ARVN held back the initial ground assault and massive airpower was directed against the VC. Colonel Vinh ordered the 1st Cavalry Squadron — commanded by Lieutenant Colonel Nguyen Huu Duong — to withdraw from Fire Support Base Alpha to reinforce Lộc Ninh. However, Duong refused, saying he would surrender his unit to the VC instead. Angered, Captain Mark A. Smith reportedly threatened to destroy the 1st Cavalry Squadron with American air power if the squadron didn't fight. From that point on, Smith virtually controlled the ARVN forces. A few moments later, elements of the ARVN 74th Ranger Battalion and the 3rd Battalion, 9th Infantry Regiment notified the regimental command post that they had broken out and were fighting their way back towards Lộc Ninh. Meanwhile, the 1st Cavalry Squadron began moving west towards the Cambodian border to engage the VC. A second ground assault in the afternoon was repelled by airstrikes however Colonel Vinh was either planning to surrender or desert when he ordered two of his soldiers to open the gates of the command compound at around 22:00. On the morning of 6 April a renewed VC assault entered the base and at this point the 9th Regiment only had 50 soldiers left, while another 150 wounded were in the hospital bunker.

In an attempt to save Lộc Ninh, Brigadier General Lê Văn Hưng ordered Task Force 52 to move north to reinforce the beleaguered 9th Regiment. Task Force 52 consisted of the 2nd Battalion, 52nd Infantry Regiment and the 1st Battalion, 48th Infantry Regiment; both transferred from the 18th Division in late March to serve as a border screen for General Hưng's forces. As the 2nd Battalion to advance towards Lộc Ninh it was ambushed at the junction of National Highway 13 and Route 17. Unable to withstand the VC's superior firepower, it was forced to withdraw. To prevent Task Force 52 from evacuating to either Lộc Ninh or An Lộc, the VC pursued Task Force 52 and bombarded their bases with heavy artillery throughout the day.

On the afternoon of 6 April, the 3rd Battalion, 9th Regiment, along with the men of the 1st Cavalry Squadron at FSB Alpha who had refused to surrender arrived at Lộc Ninh to join the defense. During the night PAVN artillery scored a direct hit on the hospital bunker, killing a large number of wounded men. Later on, another round of rockets struck the artillery compound, striking the ammunition storage bunker, which exploded. From the eastern side of the district, the VC tried to penetrate the defense line at Lộc Ninh, but were beaten off. Realizing that the situation had become hopeless, Vinh took off his uniform and told his troops to surrender. At 07:00 on 7 April, the VC massed for another ground assault from the north and west of Lộc Ninh, with support from heavy artillery, tanks and armored personnel carriers. As the VC closed in, Vinh and his bodyguards ran out the opened gate and surrendered. Several ARVN soldiers also tried to surrender, but they all returned to their positions after Smith stopped an ARVN officer from raising a white T-shirt up the flagpole. By 08:00 the 9th Regiment was completely overwhelmed when the VC overran the southern compound with their superior numbers. At around 10:00, all tactical air support was called off in order to clear the way for B-52 strikes against VC formations west of Lộc Ninh. However, the B-52 strikes could not prevent the VC from overrunning Lộc Ninh. By 16:30, the VC were in complete control of Lộc Ninh District.

Lộc Ninh became the seat of the Provisional Revolutionary Government, the capital of "liberated" territories in South Vietnam. PAVN/VC losses are estimated to exceed 1000 killed. The ARVN lost more than 3000 soldiers killed or captured; only about 50 soldiers actually reached An Lộc. The VC also captured all seven American advisers.

As Lộc Ninh was succumbing, other PAVN/VC formations turned their attention to the provincial capital of An Lộc. At 09:00 on 7 April, General Hưng ordered Task Force 52 to abandon its bases, destroy all heavy weapons and vehicles, and withdraw to An Lộc, following their failed attempt at reinforcing Lộc Ninh. As Task Force 52 tried to break through National Highway 13, they ran into another large VC ambush. It would take the soldiers of Task Force 52 about a week to reach An Lộc, infiltrating through PAVN/VC positions along the main road. Elements of the 7th Regiment defending the area were unable to hold off the VC, so they were ordered to destroy their equipment and join other ARVN units in the provincial capital. The next step in the offensive was the Battle of An Lộc.

At the start of the Battle of An Lộc the town was defended by the Division's 8th Regiment with about 2,100 men; the 7th Regiment (less one battalion) with 850 men; the 9th Regiment, most of which was destroyed at Lộc Ninh and had only had 200 men; Task Force 52, 500 men; the 3rd Ranger Group, 1,300 men; as well as Binh Long Provincial Regional Force, Popular Forces and People's Self-Defense Forces (PSDF), about 2,000 men. The initial attack on the town was repulsed by airpower and skillful use of M72 LAW rockets against PAVN tanks. The second assault on 15 April was also repulsed and the defenders were reinforced by the arrival of the 1st Airborne Brigade. The PAVN bombarded the town and gradually reduced the defensive line, while all the time being battered by US and South Vietnamese air strikes. On 11 May the PAVN 5th and 9th Divisions launched a massive all-out infantry and armor assault on An Lộc, suffering severe losses to air strikes but further squeezing the defenders. Another assault on 12 May failed to take the city. The PAVN launched a final attack on 19 May in honor of Ho Chi Minh's birthday. The attack was broken up by U.S. air support and an ambush by the Airborne. After the attacks of 11 and 12 May the PAVN directed its main efforts to cutting off any more relief columns. However, by 9 June this proved ineffective, and the defenders were able to receive the injection of manpower and supplies needed to sweep the surrounding area of PAVN and by 18 June the battle was over. The 18th Division was moved in to replace the exhausted Division and the 18th Division would spread out from An Lộc and push the PAVN back, increasing security in the area.

Following the heavy fighting, President Thiệu replaced almost all of the division commanders in the zone with Hưng being replaced Col. Tran Quoc Lich.

1973-4
By early 1973 the Division headquarters was at Lai Khê in Bình Dương Province, with one regiment usually based at Phú Giáo District. The PAVN 205th Regiment, which had been operating under the control of the 7th Division, was opposing the Division in eastern Bình Dương. Concern for the security of Phuoc Long had prompted the stationing of the 9th Regiment at Phước Bình District. At the same time, the PAVN 7th Division was operating from a base east of Highway 13 between Chơn Thành Camp and Bàu Bàng District.

In November 1973 Thiệu dismissed Lich for corruption and Col. Lê Nguyên Vỹ assumed command of the Division.

In the last half of 1973 in southern Bình Long and western Bình Dương Provinces very little combat took place. The PAVN continued its buildup in the Minh Thanh Plantation and the Lai Khê-Bến Cát area, shifted its artillery southward into the Long Nguyen area from where it increased the weight and frequency of attacks against the ARVN bases. The only ground engagement of note took place in early January 1974 just west of Chơn Thành when the 2nd Battalion, 8th Regiment was struck hard by the PAVN 7th Battalion, 209th Infantry, 7th Division. Charged with blocking Highway 13 and preventing any ARVN advance toward Minh Thanh, the 7th Battalion killed 36 ARVN soldiers in this engagement, wounded 26 others and captured 85 weapons.

On 2 July 1974 the Division relieved the 18th Division which had been fighting the PAVN 7th and 9th Divisions in the Battle of the Iron Triangle. In early September the Division renewed the effort to recapture Base 82, with the 8th Infantry Regiment nearly succeeding until being routed by a PAVN armored counterattack with casualties of 6 killed, 29 missing and 67 wounded. The 8th Regiment was relieved by the 9th Regiment which on 19 September began methodically eliminating the PAVN defensive positions, eventually recapturing the base on 4 October. In mid-November the 9th Regiment took part in the recapture of Rach Bap, ending the Iron Triangle campaign.

From 12 December 1974 to 6 January 1975 3 Battalions of the Division together with Regional Forces and Rangers fought the Battle of Phước Long.

1975

On 12 March the 3rd Battalion, 7th Regiment was attached the 25th Division and sent to reinforce Khiem Hanh. On 23 March, ARVN forces made contact with the PAVN near Truong Mit, northwest of Khiem Hanh. A major battle developed on the 24th and casualties were very heavy on both sides. The 3rd Battalion, 7th Regiment lost over 400 men killed, wounded, and missing, and the attacking
PAVN 271st Regiment, 9th Division, left nearly 200 dead. The decimated battalion was withdrawn from combat and sent to the regimental base at Phu Giao in Binh Duong Province.

Col. Vỹ committed suicide upon the surrender of his division to the PAVN on 30 April 1975.

Organisation
Component units:
 7th Infantry Regiment
 8th Infantry Regiment
 9th Infantry Regiment
 50th, 51st, 52nd and 53rd Artillery Battalions
 1st Armored Cavalry Squadron
 US Advisory Team 70

References 

005